Walter Hofstetter (born 26 March 1923) was a Swiss athlete. He competed in the men's pole vault at the 1952 Summer Olympics.

References

External links
 

1923 births
Possibly living people
Athletes (track and field) at the 1952 Summer Olympics
Swiss male pole vaulters
Olympic athletes of Switzerland